Aoraki/Mount Cook National Park is in the South Island of New Zealand. Aoraki / Mount Cook, New Zealand's highest mountain, and the eponymous village lie within the park. The area was gazetted as a national park in October 1953 and consists of reserves that were established as early as 1887 to protect the area's significant vegetation and landscape.

Even though most of the park is alpine terrain, it is easily accessible. The only road access into Aoraki/Mount Cook National Park is via , which starts near Twizel, at  distance the closest town to the park, and leads directly to Mount Cook Village, where the road ends. The village is situated within the park, however, it consists only of a hotel and motels, as well as housing and amenities for the staff of the hotel and motels and other support personnel.

Geography

The park stretches for about  along the southwest–northeast direction of the Southern Alps, covering  on the southeastern side of the main spine of the Alps. The valleys of the Tasman, Hooker, and Godley glaciers are the only entrances into this alpine territory that lie below .

Glaciers cover 40% of the park area, notably the Tasman Glacier in the Tasman Valley east of Aoraki / Mount Cook. Eight of the twelve largest glaciers in New Zealand lie within Aoraki/Mount Cook National Park, all of which terminate at proglacial lakes formed in recent decades due to a sustained period of shrinking.

In the area surrounding Aoraki / Mount Cook, the Tasman Glacier, Hooker Glacier, Murchison Glacier, and Mueller Glacier all terminate in lakes, while further north in the park, the Godley Glacier, Classen Glacier, Grey Glacier and Maud Glacier also end in proglacial lakes. Tasman Lake and Hooker Lake are easily accessible via walking tracks and are the only two of these lakes that have official names.

Other prominent peaks include Mt Tasman, Mt Hicks, Mt Sefton and Mt Elie de Beaumont. The mountains of the Southern Alps in general are young, less than ten million years old, and are still building.

The park borders Westland Tai Poutini National Park along the Main Divide. Together they form part of Te Wahipounamu South Westland World Heritage Site, recognised for its outstanding natural values.

Flora and fauna

More than 400 species of plants make up the vegetation in Aoraki/Mount Cook National Park, which include more than 100 introduced plant species such as the colourful Russell lupin, the wild cherry and wilding pines. As a result, the only pockets of forest and native bush in the park are along the southern edge of the Hooker Valley and the lower slopes of Sealy Range.

The plant life in the majority of the park consists mostly of alpine plants.  Between  and in the valleys, the vegetation is predominately snow tussock grassland, as well as golden speargrass, large mountain daisies/tikumu (Celmisia semicordata, Celmisia coriacea), and Mount Cook lily, (Ranunculus lyallii), the largest buttercup in the world. All of these plants flower in the warmer months from November to February – early in the season in the valley floors, and late at higher altitudes. At the highest rocks of Aoraki / Mount Cook, around 14 species of lichen have been found.

The native vegetation continues to be under threat by introduced plant species ranging from non-native trees through to lupins, broom and non-native grasses. These are mostly contained in the valley floors of the Tasman and Hooker Valley, since they are the most accessible parts of the park.

There are about 35 to 40 species of birds in the park including the kea, the only alpine parrot, and the well-camouflaged pipit. The tiny rock wren/pïwauwau, a threatened species, is the only permanent resident high on the mountains. It is unrelated to the rock wren of North America. Small insectivores such as the rifleman/tïtitipounamu and the New Zealand fantail/pïwakawaka live in the low forest and scrub, along with small numbers of two larger birds, the wood pigeon/kererū and morepork/ruru. Introduced species such as finches and sparrows live throughout the bush near Mount Cook Village. The black stilt or kakī, rarest wading bird in the world, lives in the braided riverbed of the Tasman.

The park is home to many invertebrates, including large dragonflies, crickets, grasshoppers, 223 recorded moth species and 7 native butterflies. A black alpine wētā, also known as the Mount Cook flea is found above the snowline. The jewelled gecko lives in the park but is rarely seen. Introduced red deer, chamois and Himalayan tahr can be hunted.

Climate

Snow falls on about 21 days per year.

During the coldest months of the year, Mueller Glacier Lake, Hooker Lake, and Tasman Lake usually freeze over at least partially.

The weather conditions in the park, in particular at higher altitudes can be unpredictable and change rapidly. Anyone venturing further than the walking tracks is strongly advised to notify their intentions at the Visitor Centre on the day you start. This is part of a formal intentions process that operates in the park and is used to initiate formal search operations.

Recreation
The park is popular for mountaineering, hunting, tramping/hiking, skiing and ski touring. The Department of Conservation administers activities in the park, including the White Horse Hill camping ground.

Mount Cook Village is the start of several walks ranging from easy walking tracks such as the popular Hooker Valley Track to tramping tracks like the steep track to the Sealy Tarns.  Some of these tracks also offer guided walking tours, and the nearby Tasman Lake hosts boat trips for tourists. The park contains close to twenty huts, mostly in alpine terrain. The huts range from basic shelters to serviced huts, with the most accessible hut being Mueller Hut, which can be reached from Mount Cook Village within 4 hours.

A visitor centre in the village features interpretation exhibits about the area's natural environment and history as well as an artwork collection.

Mountaineering

The spectacular peaks of the Aoraki / Mount Cook region have attracted climbers from all over the world for the last 100 years. The dramatic nature of these mountains provides a rare challenge. The combination of heavy glaciation, tremendous vertical scale and unpredictable weather means that they are not readily won. To climb successfully here requires skill, fitness, patience, and a great respect for the mountains. Mountaineering on the Aoraki / Mount Cook massif is a hazardous activity.

Other mountaineering routes include crossing the Aroarokaehe Range via the Copland Pass, the Mount Cook Range via the Ball Pass, and routes crossing the Tasman Saddle further north.  All of these routes still require significant alpine mountaineering experience.

On the opposite side of the Hooker Valley, Mt Ollivier was Sir Edmund Hillary's first major climb, in 1939, and since the establishment of a tramping track to Mueller Hut, not far below the summit, is now one of the easiest accessible mountains in the park.

Another mountain popular for mountaineers of intermediate skills is Sebastopol, the closest mountain to Mount Cook Village. Sebastopol offers one of few view points taking in both the Hooker Valley and the Tasman Valley.

Area history

As the glacier retreated, it filled the hollowed out valleys with rocks and gravel, leaving behind the flat-bottomed valleys seen today.

1642 – Aoraki possibly sighted by Abel Tasman and crew members
1770 – Captain Cook named the Southern Alps
1851 – Captain Stokes of the survey ship HMS Acheron gave the name Mount Cook to Aoraki
1884 – First Hermitage built under the direction of Frank Huddleson
1894 – First ascent of Aoraki / Mount Cook, on Christmas Day, by Jack Clarke, Tom Fyfe and George Graham
1910 – Freda du Faur became the first woman to climb Aoraki / Mount Cook
1911 – The vital swing bridge is built in the Hooker Valley
1913 – First ascents of the footstool and Mt Sefton made by Freda du Faur's climbing party
1913 – Hermitage first ravaged by floods in January, then destroyed beyond repair by floods two months later
1914 – First fatal accident, when three men caught in avalanche on Linda Glacier
1914 – Second Hermitage opened, on different site
1957 – Second Hermitage razed to the ground
1958 – Third Hermitage built (later extended to become the current Hermitage hotel)
1960 – First school opens, Aoraki Mount Cook School
1961 – Passenger flights begin by Mount Cook Airline, now part of Air New Zealand Link
1975 – State Highway 80 is sealed, improving access to the national park
1982 – Mark Inglis trapped in snow cave
1991 – Avalanche of 10 million cubic metres of snow and rock causes 10 metres to be lost off the top of Aoraki / Mount Cook Two decades of erosion of the ice cap exposed after this collapse reduced the height by another 30 m to 3,724 m, as revealed by new GPS data from a University of Otago climbing expedition in November 2013.
1998 – The Ngāi Tahu Claims Settlement Act officially recognises the original name, renaming the mountain Aoraki / Mount Cook

International Dark Sky Reserve 
In June 2012, an area of 430,000 hectares (1,100,000 acres) including Aoraki/Mount Cook National Park and the Mackenzie Basin was declared the Aoraki Mackenzie International Dark Sky Reserve by the International Dark-Sky Association.  At the time of the designation in 2012, the reserve was the largest in the world, and the only reserve of its type in the Southern Hemisphere.

Transport 
Rodolph Wigley's Mount Cook Motor Co was formed in 1906 to provide services to the area from the railhead at Fairlie.

Road access into the park is via State Highway 80, along the western shore of Lake Pukaki. The road ends at Mount Cook Village, with a connecting road leading to the White Horse Hill camping ground. Another small road leads to a car park near Tasman Lake, the start of a short walking track and the Ball Hut Route.

Aoraki/Mount Cook National Park is the starting point of the Alps to Ocean Cycle Trail to Oamaru. The  cycle trail has been constructed from 2010 onwards by the New Zealand Cycle Trail project.  the cycle trail still includes  along public roads.

See also
Aoraki / Mount Cook
List of mountains of New Zealand by height
Southern Alps
National parks of New Zealand
Forest parks of New Zealand
Protected areas of New Zealand

References

External links

Aoraki/Mount Cook National Park
Aoraki/Mount Cook National Park Education Resource 2010
Mt Cook: Does reaching summit outweigh risks?

 
National parks of New Zealand
Parks in Canterbury, New Zealand
Protected areas established in 1953
1953 establishments in New Zealand
Astronomy in New Zealand
International Dark Sky Reserves